Tervel can refer to:
 Tervel of Bulgaria (675–721), Emperor of the Bulgarians 700–721
 Tervel (town), Dobrich Province, Bulgaria
 Tervel Municipality, Dobrich, Bulgaria
 Tervel Peak, mountain in Antarctica's Livingston Island
 Tervel Pulev (born 1983), Bulgarian boxer